The Victorian Football League-Australian Football League (VFL/AFL) Italian Team of the Century was announced in June 2007. It recognises the role of Italian Australian players in the sport.

Players and/or at least one of the player's parents or grandparents had to have been born in Italy.  They also had to have played at least one game at VFL/AFL level.

The team
The final selected team was announced at the Palladium Room at the Crown Casino in Melbourne on 31 May 2007.

A team President was also named: Frank Costa.

Selectors 
Choosing the team from the short list were:
 Ron Barassi (chairman)
 Kevin Bartlett
 Frank Costa
 Brendon Gale
 Kevin Sheedy
 Bob Skilton
 Bill Stephen

Short list
The panel's final selection was made from a short-list of 50 (from an original list of 148).  They were (listed alphabetically):

 Steve Alessio
 Mark Arceri
 Ron Barassi, Sr. (deceased)
 Adrian Battiston
 John Benetti
 Mario Bortolotto
 Scott Camporeale
 Domenic Cassisi
 Vin Catoggio
 Frank Curcio (deceased)
 Nick Dal Santo
 Ron De Iulio
 Paul Dimattina
 Robert DiPierdomenico
 Alec Epis
 Brendan Fevola
 Silvio Foschini
 Cyril Gambetta (deceased)
 Daniel Giansiracusa
 Len Incigneri (deceased)
 Alan Johnson
 John Kennedy Jr
 Anthony Koutoufides
 Andrew Leoncelli
 Tony Liberatore
 Paul Licuria
 Stan Magro
 Gary Malarkey
 Al Mantello
 Gerald Marchesi (deceased)
 Alan Martello
 Peter Matera
 Phillip Matera
 Mark Mercuri
 Joe Misiti
 Tony Ongarello
 Peter Pianto
 Tony Polinelli
 Simon Prestigiacomo
 Adam Ramanauskas
 Peter Riccardi
 Mark Ricciuto
 Guy Rigoni
 Anthony Rocca
 Saverio Rocca
 Peter Russo
 Laurie Serafini
 Sergio Silvagni
 Stephen Silvagni
 Ian Stewart

See also
 Indigenous Team of the Century
 Greek Team of the Century

References

Australian Football League awards
Australian rules football awards
Australian rules football representative teams
VFL AFL Italian Team of the Century
VFL AFL Italian Team of the Century